FC Barsa Sumy is a youth football center and a former professional football club from Sumy, Ukraine.

History
It was created in 2012 based on the Specialized Sports School of Olympic Reserve.

After participating in the 2013 Ukrainian Football Amateur League competition the administration decided to enter the professional leagues for the 2015–16 season. Finishing in 12th position in the 2015–16 the club's administration decided to withdraw from the PFL.

League and cup history

{|class="wikitable"
|-bgcolor="#efefef"
! Season
! Div.
! Pos.
! Pl.
! W
! D
! L
! GS
! GA
! P
!Domestic Cup
!colspan=2|Europe
!Notes
|-bgcolor=SteelBlue
|align=center|2013
|align=center|4th
|align=center|5
|align=center|8
|align=center|2
|align=center|2
|align=center|4
|align=center|6
|align=center|11
|align=center|8
|align=center|
|align=center|
|align=center|
|align=center|
|-bgcolor=PowderBlue
|align=center|2015–16
|align=center|3rd
|align=center|12
|align=center|26 	
|align=center|5 	
|align=center|3 	
|align=center|18 	
|align=center|14 	
|align=center|51 	
|align=center|18
|align=center|1/32 finals
|align=center|
|align=center|
|align=center bgcolor=pink|Withdrew
|-
|align=center rowspan=2|2016-17
| rowspan="2" align="center" |Res (2nd)
|align=center|2
|align=center|18
|align=center|12
|align=center|3
|align=center|3
|align=center|40
|align=center|12
|align=center|39
|align=center rowspan=2|
|align=center rowspan=2|
|align=center rowspan=2|
|align=center|Group 1
|-
|align=center|4
|align=center|5
|align=center|1
|align=center|1
|align=center|3
|align=center|5
|align=center|15
|align=center|4
|align=center|Final group
|}

External links
 Official website

References

 
Amateur football clubs in Ukraine
Football clubs in Sumy